Henry K. Millicer, AM (11 June 1915 – 28 August 1996) born Henryk Kazimierz Milicer, was a Polish-Australian aircraft designer and pilot.

Early life and Second World War
Millicer was born in Warsaw, Poland, the son of Kazimierz Milicer, a university professor whose family was descended from Baron Karl von Militzer. An ardent Polish patriot, Henry developed an early interest in aviation. In 1924 he won an aeromodelling competition with the prize being a flight over Warsaw, his home city. At age 14 he built a full-size glider and at 17 qualified as a glider pilot. After receiving a degree in aeronautical engineering he worked as a junior designer in the National Aviation Works (Państwowe Zakłady Lotnicze) on the PZL.37 Łoś bomber project headed by Jerzy Dąbrowski and later for the RWD company on the RWD-25 low-wing, fixed-wheels fighter project. 

He was also a member of the Polish Air Force reserve and flew against the Germans at the outbreak of the Second World War, winning the Polish Air Force Cross. At the defeat of Poland in September 1939, he was given the responsibility of ferrying the presidential papers in a small plane to Romania, then escaped to France and England where he flew in a Polish bomber squadron in the Royal Air Force. He completed seventeen missions before being seriously wounded in a training exercise. He was awarded the Polish Military Medal for his service and became an interpreter between Polish, French and British pilots. In 1941 he married Warsaw-born Krystyna Paciorkowska, the daughter of the Polish politician Jerzy Paciorkowski.

Aeronautical engineer and academic
In 1943 he obtained a scholarship to study for a master's degree in aeronautical engineering at Imperial College, London, joining Airspeed Ltd. in 1945 and later the Percival Aircraft Company. The Percival Provost design is attributed to Millicer. In 1950 he migrated to Australia and became chief aerodynamicist at the Government Aircraft Factories (GAF), working on the Jindivik and the Malkara missile. With two colleagues, Gordon Bennett (head of structures) and James Tutty, he entered a design competition sponsored by the Royal Aero Club of London for a replacement aircraft for the de Havilland Chipmunk. The Millicer team beat 103 contestants and won the competition with a design that ultimately became the Victa Airtourer.

After several years of production Victa Aviation sold the rights to a New Zealand company. Millicer also had developed a slightly larger 4 place aircraft known as the Aircruiser, with one prototype built at the Bankstown, New South Wales, Victa factory and first flown in 1966. A military trainer version of this was under development at the time of the closure of the Victa operation which was subsequently converted in NZ into the PAC CT/4 military trainer. 

His other inventions include a patent for the vortex flap and a suction grass mower (honored in the Sydney 2000 Olympics opening). He also published Aerodynamics for Soaring Pilots for the Gliding Club of Victoria.

Millicer became the principal lecturer in Aeronautics at the Royal Melbourne Institute of Technology (RMIT) with a view to establishing this faculty as the leading school in Australia. He retired in 1980 but remained associated with his faculty at RMIT and in 1984 his work was recognised with the award of an Honorary Doctorate in aeronautical engineering. In 1992 he was made a Member of the Order of Australia. He continued to be involved in the design of aircraft and formed Millicer Aircraft Industries which bought the rights to the Aircruiser that Millicer had designed for Victa. He continued to act as an advisor for aeronautical graduate projects on a part-time basis. 

Millicer died at the age of 81. His ashes were scattered from the air over the coast near his home at Anglesea, off the Great Ocean Road. He is survived by a son, Richard Maciej, and two daughters, the author Joanna Millicer Hempel, and Helen Millicer, and eight grandchildren.

References

1915 births
1996 deaths
Alumni of Imperial College London
Australian aerospace engineers
Australian aviators
Polish emigrants to Australia
Members of the Order of Australia
Polish aerospace engineers
Polish aviators
Polish World War II pilots
Academic staff of RMIT University